St Barnabas Hospital may refer to:

 St Barnabas Hospital (Eastern Cape), South Africa
 St. Barnabas Hospital (Bronx), New York, U.S.
 Saint Barnabas Medical Center, Livingston, New Jersey, U.S.
 St. Barnabas's Hospital in Beijing, Beijing, China
 St. Barnabas' Hospital (Osaka), Japan